The 2019 Washington Huskies football team represented the University of Washington during the 2019 NCAA Division I FBS football season. The Huskies were led by head coach Chris Petersen, in his sixth and final year as head coach. The team looked to improve upon its 10–4 record from 2018. After the regular season, Petersen announced that the team's postseason bowl game, the Las Vegas Bowl, would be his final game with the Huskies. Respected defensive coordinator Jimmy Lake would take over the reins after the Las Vegas Bowl, firing two offensive coordinators within 24 hours. They played their home games at Husky Stadium in Seattle, competing as a member of the North Division in the Pac-12 Conference.

Preseason

Coaching changes
Matt Lubick, who served as wide receivers coach and co-offensive coordinator in the previous two seasons, resigned in January 2019. He indicated he was leaving the coaching profession entirely. On January 17, 2019, Washington announced it had hired Junior Adams to replace Lubick as wide receivers coach.

Recruiting
Washington's 2019 recruiting class consisted of 23 recruits. The class was ranked as the 16th best in the country and the second-best in the Pac-12 Conference behind Oregon according to the 247Sports.com Composite.

Pac-12 media day

Pac-12 media poll
In the Pac-12 preseason media poll, Washington was predicted to finish in second place in the North Division, receiving one fewer vote than Oregon. The Huskies finished with the third-most votes to win the Pac-12 Championship Game.

Schedule
Washington's 2019 schedule began with a home non-conference game against Eastern Washington of the Big Sky Conference. Washington's two other non-conference games were against Hawaii of the Mountain West Conference at home, and a road game against BYU, a football independent. In Pac-12 Conference play, the Huskies played the other members of the North Division and drew Arizona, Colorado, USC, and Utah from the South Division.

Source:

Rankings

Personnel

Coaching staff

Roster

Game summaries

Eastern Washington

California

Hawaii

at BYU

Referee: Steven Strimling

USC

at Stanford

at Arizona

Oregon

Utah
Referee: Mike McCabe

at Oregon State

at Colorado

Washington State

vs. Boise State (Las Vegas Bowl)

Players drafted into the NFL

References

Washington
Washington Huskies football seasons
Las Vegas Bowl champion seasons
Washington Huskies football
Washington Huskies football